Oshdalaq (also known as Uchky ‘Uliya, Ūshdelaq, Ushtula, and Uzhkyulya) is a village in Goyjah Bel Rural District, in the Central District of Ahar County, East Azerbaijan Province, Iran. At the 2006 census, its population was 29, in 9 families.

References 

Populated places in Ahar County